Schmardaea is a genus of trees in the family Meliaceae. It solely comprises the species Schmardaea microphylla.

Distribution and habitat
Found in cloud forests and dry forests at mid elevations and up to 2700 m in Venezuela, Colombia, Ecuador and Peru.

References

Meliaceae genera
Meliaceae
Trees of Peru
Trees of Colombia
Trees of Ecuador
Trees of Venezuela
Monotypic Sapindales genera
Taxonomy articles created by Polbot